The Young Communist League was the youth wing of the Communist Party of Cuba. The LJC was founded in 1928. As of 1933, LJC was estimated to have around 5,000 members.

References

Youth wings of political parties in Cuba
Youth wings of communist parties
1928 establishments in Cuba
Popular Socialist Party (Cuba)
Youth organizations established in 1928